Inquest is a 1931 German crime film directed by Robert Siodmak and starring Albert Bassermann, Gustav Fröhlich and Hans Brausewetter. Along with another film that Siodmak made the same year Storms of Passion, it anticipates the later development of film noir. It was made by German's largest studio Universum Film, with sets designed by art director Erich Kettelhut. Paul Martin, who soon after emerged as a leading director, was assistant director to Siodmak on the film. It was based on a 1927 play of the same title by Max Alsberg and Ernst Hesse. A separate French-language version About an Inquest was also produced.

Synopsis
When a prostitute is murdered in a cheap Berlin boarding house, an investigating judge suspects that the killer is her boyfriend, unaware that his own son and daughter are also mixed up in the case.

Background 
The film was shot from February 18 to March 1931 in Berlin-Tiergarten and in the Ufa studio in Neubabelsberg. The buildings were created by Erich Kettelhut. The street signs and house numbers in the picture indicate Mittelstraße 63 as the location of the action.

Cast
 Albert Bassermann as Dr. Konrad Bienert, Landgerichtsrat
 Gustav Fröhlich as Fritz Bernt, Student
 Hans Brausewetter as Walter Bienert, Beinerts Sohn, Student
 Charlotte Ander as Gerda Bienert - Bienerts Tochter
 Anni Markart as Erna Kabisch
 Edith Meinhard as Mella Ziehr
 Oskar Sima as Karl Zülke, Portier
 Julius Falkenstein as Anatol Scherr, ein Hausbewohner
 Heinrich Gretler as Kurt Brann, sein Untermieter
 Hermann Speelmans as Bruno Klatte, Artist
 Jakob Tiedtke as Ein genierter Herr
 Gerhard Bienert as Baumann, Kriminalkommissar
 Heinz Berghaus as Schneider, Kriminalbeamter
 Carl Lambertin as Kriebel, Kiminalbeamter
 Emilia Unda
 Erwin Splettstößer

References

Bibliography

External links 
 
 Voruntersuchung Full movie at the Deutsche Filmothek

1931 films
Films of the Weimar Republic
German crime films
1931 crime films
1930s German-language films
Films directed by Robert Siodmak
Films set in Berlin
Films shot in Berlin
German films based on plays
German multilingual films
UFA GmbH films
Films shot at Babelsberg Studios
German black-and-white films
Films produced by Erich Pommer
1931 multilingual films
1930s German films